RNIE 1 is a national highway of Benin. It runs along the Atlantic coast from the Togolese to the Nigerian border, and passes through Cotonou and Porto-Novo.

References

Roads in Benin